The Gringo Trail refers to a string of the places most often visited by "gringos", Canadians, Americans, other budget travelers, vice tourists, backpackers, Anglo-European, Dutch, German heritage foreigners in Latin America.

Geographical reach
The Gringo Trail encompasses almost all of Latin America, except Brazil, but there is no overland route on the Pan-American Highway between Central America and South America across the Darién Gap. Travelers generally charter sailboats in Panama or take the ferry.

North America

 Mexico:
 Chichen Itza
 Guanajuato
 Isla Mujeres
 Oaxaca
 Puerto Escondido
 Querétaro
 Tulum

Central America

 Belize:
 Caye Caulker
 San Ignacio

 Costa Rica:
 Arenal
 La Fortuna
 Jacó
 Manuel Antonio National Park
 Montezuma
 Nosara
 Puerto Viejo de Talamanca

 Guatemala:
 Antigua
 Lake Atitlán
 Semuc Champey
 Tikal

 Honduras:
 Bay Islands
 Copán

 Nicaragua:
 Corn Islands
 Granada
 Leon
 Ometepe Island
 San Juan del Sur

 Panama:
 Bocas Del Toro
 Boquete
 Panama City (especially the Casco Viejo)
 San Blas Islands

 El Salvador:
 Joya de Cerén
 El Sunzal
 Tazumal

South America

 Argentina:
 Buenos Aires
 Iguaçu Falls
 Mendoza
 Ushuaia

 Bolivia:
 La Paz
 Potosí
 Salar de Uyuni
 Lake Titicaca 

 Chile:
 Easter Island
 Pucón
 San Pedro de Atacama
 Torres del Paine

 Colombia:
 Bogotá
 Cartagena
 Medellín
 San Gil
 Taganga
 Tayrona National Natural Park

 Ecuador:
 Cuenca
 Galápagos Islands
 Mompiche
 Montañita
 Quito

 Peru:
 Arequipa
 Cusco
 Ica (Huacachina)
 Iquitos
 Lima
 Machu Picchu
 Máncora
 Nazca
 Puno

See also
 Banana Pancake Trail
 Hippie trail
 Lonely Planet
 Grand Tour – 17th–19th century Continental tour undertaken by young European aristocrats, partly as leisure and partly educational
 Gringo Trails –  A 2013 documentary by anthropologist Pegi Vail on the lasting impact of global tourism on cultures, economies, and the environment

References

External links

Tourist attractions in North America
Tourist attractions in Central America
Tourist attractions in South America
Hiking trails in South America
Hiking trails in Mexico